Hieracium coronarium is a species of flowering plant belonging to the family Asteraceae.

Its native range is Northern and Northeastern Europe.

Synonym:
 Hieracium diversifolium Sael. ex Norrl.

References

coronarium